The Order of Saints Cyril and Methodius is an award conferred by the Republic of Bulgaria.

History 
It has had three incarnations : 
 first on 18 May 1909 by the Kingdom of Bulgaria, 
 second on 13 December 1950 by the People's Republic of Bulgaria (but called the Order of Cyril and Methodius),
 finally on 29 May 2003 by the current Republic of Bulgaria.

The Royal Order

History 
The Order was established on 18 May 1909 by Tsar Ferdinand I of Bulgaria (grandfather of former Tsar Simeon II), the first Grand Cross of this order to be awarded to the highest state officials.

Grades 
It consisted of one class: Knight, represented by a collar, sash and breast-star.

Insignia 
The collar of the members is gilded-silver and alternately shows a standing, crowned lion facing left and a fleur-de-lis.

The ribbon of the Order is pale orange.

The badge of the Order is a gilded Byzantine cross enameled in light blue. In the cross angles, green enameled beams are mounted, on each of which is a stylized lily. In the medallion resting figures of Saints Cyril and Methodius are seen standing side by side. The medallion is edged with a golden ring on the blue enameled inscription "EX ORIENTE LUX" (light coming from the east).

The breast star has the shape of a Maltese cross and is made of silver. In the cross angles blazing flames are seen with applied lily. In the centre of the cross is a representation of a seraph.

Royal House 
Former King Simeon II of Bulgaria considers this version of the order to be his dynastic order and wears it  - from left shoulder to right hip - on official occasions such as the wedding of Victoria, Crown Princess of Sweden and Daniel Westling

Order of Cyril and Methodius (1950) 

The People's Republic of Bulgaria instituted the Order of Cyril and Methodius  (the word Saints was dropped under the communist regime). It was awarded as an honour in the fields of science, culture, or painting

Grades 
It consisted of three classes:  First class, Second class and Third class

Insignia 
The prize is a round medal with red, blue or white enamel background. It shows the image of the Saints in relief. In the left side, Cyril, who holds a scroll with the first four letters of the Cyrillic alphabet in the hands. Slightly offset to the right behind Methodius with a Bible under his arm. One five-pointed star is seen on the top of the medal, hanging from a light-blue ribbon.

 First class: gold medal with red enamel.
 Second class: silver medal with blue enamel.
 Third class: silver medal with white enamel.

The medal is worn on the left chest.

The Republic of Bulgaria (2003) 

The Order of Saints Cyril and Methodius was reinstated on 29 May 2003 as the second order of the republic after the Order of Stara Planina and is awarded for merit in the fields of art, science, education and culture.

Grades 
There are three grades: Collar, 1st Class (Officer) and 2nd Class (Knight)

Insignia 
The order's insignia is inspired by the shape of the tsarist era: 
 The medal of the first two grades is a silver-plated Byzantine cross with gilded-silver edges, the 3rd grade is only totally silver-plated.
 The flames in the cross angle are no longer subject to a lily 
 On the reverse, instead of the crowned cipher names, the national colors of the country can be found.

The ribbon of the Order is orange

See also
 Orders, decorations, and medals of Bulgaria

References

Orders, decorations, and medals of Bulgaria

ru:Орден «Святые Кирилл и Мефодий»